The canton of Ozoir-la-Ferrière is an administrative division of the Seine-et-Marne department, in northern France. It was created at the French canton reorganisation which came into effect in March 2015. Its seat is in Ozoir-la-Ferrière.

It consists of the following communes: 

Chevry-Cossigny 
Favières
Férolles-Attilly
Ferrières-en-Brie
Gretz-Armainvilliers
Lésigny
Ozoir-la-Ferrière
Pontcarré
Servon
Tournan-en-Brie
Villeneuve-le-Comte
Villeneuve-Saint-Denis

References

Cantons of Seine-et-Marne